Yunior Marte (born February 2, 1995) is a Dominican professional baseball pitcher for the Philadelphia Phillies of Major League Baseball (MLB). In 2012, he signed as an international free agent with the Kansas City Royals. He made his MLB debut for the San Francisco Giants in 2022.

Career
Marte was born in Santo Domingo, in the Dominican Republic. During the offseason he lives in Santo Domingo Norte, Dominican Republic.

Kansas City Royals
On July 19, 2012, when he was 17 years of age, he was signed as an international free agent by the Kansas City Royals for $200,000, but the supposed result of the medical exams said that he had an elbow injury, so the team gave up signing him and days later they negotiated with his agent Alberto Barjam and reached a $75,000 agreement. . In 2013, Marte was named Dominican Royals Pitcher of the Year in the Dominican Summer League, after going 4–3 with an ERA of 1.71 in 11 appearances covering  innings. Marte spent the 2014 season with the rookie-level Burlington Royals, posting a 4–3 record and 3.44 ERA in 11 contests. In 2015, Marte played for the Single-A Lexington Legends, recording a 4–5 record and 6.44 ERA with 60 strikeouts in 18 games.

In 2016, for Single-A Lexington, Marte was 6–8 with one save and a 4.21 ERA in 26 games (7 starts), in which he pitched a career-high 107 innings, threw 19 wild pitches (2nd in the South Atlantic League), led the league with 3 balks, and struck out 103 batters. He ranked sixth among South Atlantic League relievers, with a batting average against of .225. 

In 2017, Marte was a Carolina League mid-season All Star with the High-A Wilmington Blue Rocks. Marte also made 17 appearances for the Double-A Northwest Arkansas Naturals on the year, registering a 5.75 ERA with 38 strikeouts in 36 innings pitched. In 2018 pitching for the Class AA Northwest Arkansas Naturals he was 4–4 with two saves and a 2.91 ERA in 43 relief appearances in which Marte pitched  innings and struck out 80 batters.

In 2019, Marte split the year between Northwest Arkansas and the Triple-A Omaha Storm Chasers. In 14 appearances between the two teams, he posted a 4.19 ERA with 15 strikeouts in  innings of work. Marte did not play in a game in 2020 due to the cancellation of the minor league season because of the COVID-19 pandemic. On November 2, 2020, he elected minor league free agency.

San Francisco Giants
On December 9, 2020, Marte signed a minor league contract with the San Francisco Giants organization. In 2021 for the Triple-A Sacramento River Cats, Marte was 0–3 with four saves and a 3.49 ERA in 43 games (one start). The Giants added Marte to their 40-man roster following the 2021 season on November 7, 2021. 

After 3 scoreless appearances for Sacramento, on April 12, 2022, Marte was promoted to the major leagues for the first time to fill in for Tyler Rogers, who had been placed on paternity leave. Marte made his MLB debut that day, pitching a scoreless inning of relief and allowing one hit to close out a 13–2 victory over the San Diego Padres. Marte was optioned back to Triple-A the following day after John Brebbia was reinstated from the bereavement list.

Pitching for the Giants in 2022, he was 1–1 with a 5.44 ERA in 39 relief appearances, in which he pitched 48 innings. Batters had a barrel percentage against him of 3.5%, in the lowest 3% in MLB. He mostly threw an 86 mph slider, a 97 mph sinker, and a 98 mph four-seam fastball.  Pitching for Sacramento in 2022 he was 1–1 with three saves and a 3.16 ERA in 25 relief appearances, in which he pitched  innings, giving up nine hits and striking out 35 batters.

Philadelphia Phillies
On January 9, 2023, the Giants traded Marte to the Philadelphia Phillies in exchange for Erik Miller.

See also
 List of Major League Baseball players from the Dominican Republic

References

External links

1995 births
Living people
Major League Baseball players from the Dominican Republic
Major League Baseball pitchers
San Francisco Giants players
Dominican Summer League Royals players
Burlington Royals players
Lexington Legends players
Wilmington Blue Rocks players
Northwest Arkansas Naturals players
Gigantes del Cibao players
Omaha Storm Chasers players
Criollos de Caguas players
Sacramento River Cats players